A multimedia extension connector (MXC) is a method of connecting video cameras and other video inputs to video capture cards and the like. MXC is based on the 8-pin Mini-DIN connector. It is used by Winnov's range of Videum capture cards.

External links
Videum 1000 Plus Family Quick Start Guide listing on page 9 the pinout of the MXC connector.

Computer connectors
Electrical connectors
Audiovisual connectors
RF connectors
Deutsches Institut für Normung